Jamie Luke Smith (born 12 July 2000) is an English cricketer. He made his Twenty20 debut for Surrey in the 2018 t20 Blast on 5 July 2018. He made his first-class debut for Surrey against Marylebone Cricket Club in Dubai on 24 March 2019. He scored a century, becoming the ninth batsman for Surrey to score a century on first-class debut. He was dismissed for 127 in the first innings, setting a new record for the highest score made on first-class debut for Surrey. He made his List A debut on 25 April 2019, for Surrey in the 2019 Royal London One-Day Cup.

In April 2022, in the 2022 County Championship, Smith scored his maiden double century in first-class cricket, with 234 not out against Gloucestershire.

References

External links
 

2000 births
Living people
English cricketers
Surrey cricketers
Cricketers from Epsom
English cricketers of the 21st century